The Law and Order Party of Rhode Island was a short-lived political party in the U.S. state of Rhode Island in the 1840s, brought into existence as a consequence of the Dorr Rebellion.

Background
In 1840, Rhode Island still used as its constitution the King's Charter of 1663, which held that only landowners with $134 in property could vote. This effectively disenfranchised 60% of the state's free white men.

History
In 1841 and 1842, Rhode Island Governor Samuel Ward King faced opposition by Thomas Wilson Dorr and his followers, the Rhode Island Suffrage Party, who wanted to extend suffrage to a wider group of citizens.

Governor King put together a Law and Order coalition of Whigs and conservative Democrats to put down the opposition. King and his coalition declared martial law on May 4, 1842. The state militia ended the rebellion by the end of the summer of 1842.

Although they were initially opposed to extending suffrage, the Law and Order Party realized that the 1663 charter was archaic. After the rebellion, it became clear that they needed to compromise. In November 1842, they drafted a "Law And Order Constitution" which extended the right to vote to all native-born adult males, including black men. Effective May 1843, this new Constitution replaced the old King's Charter of 1663.

Elected officeholders
 Governor James Fenner (1843–1845)
 Governor Byron Diman (1846–1847)
 United States Senator John B. Francis (1843–1845)
 United States Representative Henry Y. Cranston (1843–1847) – served as a Whig during his second term)
 United States Representative Elisha R. Potter (1843–1845)

References

History of Rhode Island
Defunct state and local conservative parties in the United States
Political parties in Rhode Island
Dorr Rebellion